Leptocarpus is a genus of dioeceous rush-like perennial plants described as a genus in 1810.

The genus as currently conceived is entirely endemic to Australia. A few species native to other places were formerly included, but they have been moved to other genera.

Species 
The following species are accepted as of 2021:

Leptocarpus canus Nees
 Leptocarpus coangustatus Nees
 Leptocarpus crassipes Pate & Meney
 Leptocarpus crebriculmis B.G.Briggs
 Leptocarpus decipiens B.G.Briggs
 Leptocarpus denmarkicus (Suess.) B.G.Briggs
 Leptocarpus depilatus B.G.Briggs
 Leptocarpus kraussii B.G.Briggs
 Leptocarpus laxus (R.Br.) B.G.Briggs
 Leptocarpus roycei B.G.Briggs
 Leptocarpus scariosus R.Br.
 Leptocarpus scoparius B.G.Briggs
 Leptocarpus tenax (Labill.) R.Br.
 Leptocarpus tephrinus B.G.Briggs
 Leptocarpus thysananthus B.G.Briggs
 Leptocarpus trisepalus (Nees) B.G.Briggs

Formerly included 
Over 70 other names have been published using the name Leptocarpus, but they have been transferred to other genera, including the following: 

 Apodasmia, Chaetanthus, Dapsilanthus, Empodisma, Hydrophilus, Hypolaena, Lepyrodia, Meeboldina, Restio, Rhodocoma, Staberoha, Willdenowia.

Name in homonymic genus 
In 1820, the name Leptocarpus was applied to some plants in the Verbenaceae. Thus was created an illegitimate homonym. One species name was included in the illegitimate genus, i.e.:
Leptocarpus chamaedrifolius  – Tamonea spicata

References

Restionaceae
Poales genera
Endemic flora of Australia